Fusk (also Romanized as Fūsk; also known as Qūshk) is a village in Derakhtengan Rural District, in the Central District of Kerman County, Kerman Province, Iran. At the 2006 Census, its population was 120, in 41 families.

References 

Populated places in Kerman County